The Strait of Malacca is a narrow stretch of water, 500 mi (800 km) long and from 40 to 155 mi (65–250 km) wide, between the Malay Peninsula (Peninsular Malaysia) to the northeast and the Indonesian island of Sumatra  to the southwest, connecting the Andaman Sea (Indian Ocean) and the South China Sea (Pacific Ocean). As the main shipping channel between the Indian and Pacific oceans, it is one of the most important shipping lanes in the world. It is named after the Malacca Sultanate that ruled over the strait between 1400 and 1511, the center of administration of which was located in the modern-day state of Malacca, Malaysia.

Extent
The International Hydrographic Organization define the limits of the Strait of Malacca as follows:

History

Early traders from Arabia, Africa, Persia, and Southern India reached Kedah before arriving at Guangzhou.  Kedah served as a western port on the Malay Peninsula. They traded glassware, camphor, cotton goods, brocades, ivory, sandalwood, perfume, and precious stones. These traders sailed to Kedah via the monsoon winds between June and November. They returned between December and May. Kedah provided accommodations, porters, small vessels, bamboo rafts, elephants, as well as tax collections for goods to be transported overland toward the eastern ports of the Malay Peninsula such as Langkasuka and Kelantan. After the tenth century, ships from China began to trade at these eastern trading posts and ports. Kedah and Funan were famous ports throughout the 6th century, before shipping began to use the Strait of Malacca itself as a trade route.

In the 7th century the maritime empire of Srivijaya, based in Palembang, Sumatra, rose to power, and its influence expanded to the Malay peninsula and Java. The empire gained effective control of two major choke points in maritime Southeast Asia: the Strait of Malacca and the Sunda Strait. By launching a series of conquests and raids on potential rival ports on both sides of the strait, Srivijaya ensured its economic and military domination in the region, which lasted for about 700 years. Srivijaya gained great benefits from the lucrative spice trade, e.g. the tributary trade system with China, and trade with Indian and Arab merchants. The Strait of Malacca became an important maritime trade route between India and China. The importance of the Strait of Malacca in global trade networks continued well into later centuries with the rise of the Malacca Sultanate in the 15th century, the Johor Sultanate, and the modern city-state of Singapore.

Since the 17th century, the strait has been the main shipping channel between the Indian Ocean and the Pacific Ocean. Various major regional powers have managed the straits during different historical periods.

In the early 19th century, the Dutch and British empires drew an arbitrary boundary line in the strait and promised to hunt down pirates on their respective sides; that line went on to become today's border between Malaysia and Indonesia.

Economic importance

From an economic and strategic perspective, the Strait of Malacca is one of the most important shipping lanes in the world.

The strait is the main shipping channel between the Indian Ocean and the Pacific Ocean, linking major Asian economies such as India, Thailand, Indonesia, Malaysia, Philippines, Singapore, Vietnam, China, Japan, Taiwan, and South Korea. The Strait of Malacca is part of the Maritime Silk Road that runs from the Chinese coast towards the southern tip of India to Mombasa, from there through the Red Sea via the Suez Canal to the Mediterranean, there to the Upper Adriatic region to the northern Italian hub of Trieste with its rail connections to Central Europe and the North Sea. Over 94,000 vessels pass through the strait each year (2008) making it the busiest strait in the world, carrying about 25% of the world's traded goods, including oil, Chinese manufactured products, coal, palm oil and Indonesian coffee.  About a quarter of all oil carried by sea passes through the Strait, mainly from Persian Gulf suppliers to Asian markets. In 2007, an estimated 13.7 million barrels per day were transported through the strait, increasing to an estimated 15.2 million barrels per day in 2011. In addition, it is also one of the world's most congested shipping choke points because it narrows to only 2.8 km (1.5 nautical miles) wide at the Phillip Channel (close to the south of Singapore).

The draught of some of the world's largest ships (mostly oil tankers) exceeds the Strait's minimum depth of 25 metres (82 feet). This shallow point occurs in the Singapore Strait. The maximum size of a vessel that can pass through the Strait is referred to as the Malaccamax. The next closest passageway to the east, the Sunda Strait between Sumatra and Java, is even shallower and narrower, meaning that ships exceeding the Malaccamax must detour a few thousand nautical miles and use the Lombok Strait, Makassar Strait, Sibutu Passage, and Mindoro Strait instead.

Shipping hazards

Piracy has been a problem in the strait. Piracy had been high in the 2000s, with additional increase after the events of September 11, 2001. After attacks rose again in the first half of 2004, regional navies stepped up their patrols of the area in July 2004. Subsequently, attacks on ships in the Strait of Malacca dropped, to 79 in 2005 and 50 in 2006. Attacks have dropped to near zero in recent years.

There are 34 shipwrecks, some dating to the 1880s, in the local TSS channel (the channel for commercial ships under the global Traffic Separation Scheme). These pose a collision hazard in the narrow and shallow strait.

On 20 August 2017, the United States Navy destroyer  lost ten of its crew's lives in a collision with the merchant ship Alnic MC a short distance east of the strait whilst full steering capabilities had been lost. The ship had made a series of errors in attempted mitigation, its external lights being changed to "red over red" ("vessel not under command").

Another risk is the annual haze due to wildfires in Sumatra, Indonesia.

Proposals to relieve the strait

China has offered to cover the costs, according to a report leaked to The Washington Times in 2004. Nevertheless, and despite the support of several Thai politicians, the prohibitive financial and ecological costs suggest that such a canal will not be built.

An alternative is to install a pipeline across the Isthmus of Kra to carry oil to ships waiting on the other side. Proponents calculate it would cut the cost of oil delivery to Asia by about $0.50/barrel ($3/m3). Myanmar has also made a similar pipeline proposal.

See also
 Geostrategic context
 Andaman and Nicobar Command
 Andaman Sea
 Bay of Bengal
 Exclusive economic zone of Indonesia
 Exclusive economic zone of Malaysia
 Exclusive economic zone of Thailand
 Exclusive economic zone of India

 Local context
 Malacca City
 Malaccamax
 Lingga Roads
 Malacca Strait Bridge
 George Town, Penang
 History of Kedah
 Kedah Sultanate
 Action of 10 September 1782
 Battle of Penang
 Action of 13 November 1943
 Action of 11 January 1944
 Action of 14 February 1944
 Action of 17 July 1944
 Battle of the Malacca Strait
 Mangroves of the Straits of Malacca
 Piracy in the Strait of Malacca

References

Further reading
 Borschberg, Peter, The Singapore and Melaka Straits: Violence, Security and Diplomacy in the 17th Century (Singapore and Leiden: NUS Press and KITLV Press, 2010). https://www.academia.edu/4302722
 Borschberg, Peter, ed., Iberians in the Singapore-Melaka Area and Adjacent Regions (16th to 18th Century) (Wiesbaden and Lisbon: Harrassowitz and Fundação Oriente, 2004). https://www.academia.edu/4302708
 Borschberg, Peter, ed. The Memoirs and Memorials of Jacques de Coutre. Security, Trade and Society in 17th Century Southeast Asia (Singapore: NUS Press, 2013). https://www.academia.edu/4302722
 Borschberg, Peter, ed., Journal, Memorials and Letters of Cornelis Matelieff de Jonge. Security, Diplomacy and Commerce in 17th Century Southeast Asia (Singapore: NUS Press, 2015). https://www.academia.edu/4302783
 Borschberg, Peter, "The value of Admiral Matelieff's writings for the history of Southeast Asia, c. 1600–1620", Journal of Southeast Asian Studies, 48(3), pp. 414–435. 
 Borschberg P. and M. Krieger, ed., Water and State in Asia and Europe (New Delhi: Manohar, 2008). https://www.academia.edu/4311610

External links

 World oil transit chokepoints
 Maritime Security in Southeast Asia: U.S., Japanese, Regional, and Industry Strategies (National Bureau of Asian Research, November 2010)
 BBC News report on the increased security in the Straits
 "Going for the jugular" Report on the potential terrorist threat to the Straits. From the Economist, requires subscription, in the print edition June 10, 2004
 China builds up strategic sea lanes
 A report from the International Maritime Organisation on the implementation of a Straits "Marine Electronic Highway" - a series of technological measures to ensure safe and efficient use of the busy waters
 Malacca, Singapore, and Indonesia (1978) by Michael Leifer
 The Malacca Straits Research and Development Centre homepage
 Al-Jazeera: Malacca Strait nations plan air patrol
 The Strategic Importance of the Straits of Malacca for World Trade and Regional Development
 AP: Singapore warns of terror threat in Malacca Strait, 2010-03-04

 
International straits
Malacca
Malacca
Malacca
Malacca
Maritime Southeast Asia
Andaman Sea
Malay Peninsula
Peninsular Malaysia
Southern Thailand
Indonesia–Malaysia border
Indonesia–Thailand border
Landforms of Johor
Landforms of Sumatra
Landforms of Thailand
Straits of Asia
Shipping in Asia
Sea lanes
Malacca
Malacca